Owain Rhys Jones (born 1 October 1996) is a Welsh footballer who plays as a winger or a striker for Cymru Premier side Pontypridd United.

Early life

Jones was born in Swansea and educated at Ysgol Dyffryn Aman, Ammanford, Wales.

Club career

Early career
Jones played junior football for Pontardawe Town Juniors AFC before signing for Swansea City at the age of 10.

Swansea City
Prolific in front of goal, Jones was integrated into the Swansea City U21s squad during 2014–15 having scored 16 goals in 20 appearances for the U18s team. He was offered his first professional contract in 2014 for Swansea City.

Yeovil Town (loan)
On 31 January 2017, Jones signed for Yeovil Town on loan until the end of the season. Jones made his English Football League debut for Yeovil against Hartlepool United, on 4 February 2017.

Upon his return from his loan spell with Yeovil, Jones was released by Swansea at the end of the 2016–17 season.

Merthyr Town
Following his release from Swansea, Jones signed for Merthyr Town in 2017.

Nuneaton Borough
On the 21 June 2018, Jones signed for National League North side Nuneaton Borough.

Return to Merthyr Town
Jones was loaned back to Merthyr Town in September 2018 before later joining permanently.

Aberystwyth Town
Following his departure from Merthyr, Jones signed for Cymru Premier side Aberystwyth Town on 17 June 2020. He was given the number 20 shirt for the 2020–21 season.

International career 

In 2011, Jones represented Wales at U16 level at a triangular tournament in Belgium involving the hosts, Wales and Switzerland.

The 2012–13 season saw Jones being called up into the Wales U17 squad in the European Championship Qualification Group stage against England, Northern Ireland and Estonia.

Jones was selected for the Wales U19s squad the following season for their European Championship Qualification Group stage in Georgia scoring the first goal in a 6–0 victory in their final game against Moldova  – a win which ensured qualification for the Elite Round in Portugal where Jones made 2 further appearances. In 2014–15, Jones was again selected for the U19s squad U19 European Championship Qualification Group campaign and started in all 3 games in Portugal.

Still aged 18, Jones was called into the U21 squad for the European Championship fixture against Bulgaria at the Cardiff City Stadium on 31 March 2015. He was an unused substitute in a 3–1 win. Later in the qualification campaign, Jones made his debut in a 2–1 win over Armenia.

Honours

Individual 
 Swansea City U18 Player of the Year: 2014–15

References 

Living people
1996 births
Footballers from Swansea
Welsh footballers
Wales youth international footballers
Association football forwards
Swansea City A.F.C. players
Yeovil Town F.C. players
Merthyr Town F.C. players
Nuneaton Borough F.C. players
English Football League players
Southern Football League players
National League (English football) players
Aberystwyth Town F.C. players
Cymru Premier players